Ulrich 'Uli' Ernst Borowka (born 19 May 1962) is a German former professional footballer who played as a defender.

A versatile blue-collar worker with a powerful shot, he spent the better part of his career at Werder Bremen (nearly one full decade), amassing Bundesliga totals of 388 games and 19 goals over the course of 15 seasons.

Borowka represented West Germany at Euro 1988.

Club career
Born in Menden (Sauerland), Borowka made his Bundesliga debut at the age of 19 for Borussia Mönchengladbach, becoming a regular from his second season onwards – in 1984–85, as the team finished fourth, he scored a career-best five goals in 32 matches.

In 1987, Borowka signed for SV Werder Bremen, being a defensive mainstay for the club in six of his nine seasons and managing to net at least once in seven of them. In his debut campaign he helped to the league conquest, the first in 23 years, scoring in a 1–0 win at SV Waldhof Mannheim on 9 April 1988.

Borowka played in a total of 46 official matches in the 1991–92 season, including eight in Werder's victorious run in the UEFA Cup Winners' Cup. The following season he added another league, eventually leaving the club in December 1995 at nearly 34, for amateurs Tasmania 1900 Berlin. Subsequently he played for Hannover 96 (third level, only one month) and Widzew Łódź, becoming the first German to play in the Polish Ekstraklasa before finally retiring in the amateur leagues, at the age of 38.

After retiring, Borowka had various spells in coaching, with little impact.

International career
Borowka earned six caps for West Germany in 1988, and featured for the nation at UEFA Euro 1988, playing all four matches for the semifinalists (two complete). His debut came on 2 April in a friendly with Argentina, a 1–0 win in Berlin in preparation for the continental competition.

Honours
Borussia Mönchengladbach
DFB-Pokal runners-up: 1983–84

Werder Bremen
Bundesliga: 1987–88, 1992–93
DFB-Pokal: 1990–91, 1993–94; runners-up 1988–89, 1989–90
UEFA Cup Winners' Cup: 1991–92
DFL-Supercup: 1988, 1993, 1994

Widzew Łódź
Ekstraklasa: 1996–97

References

External links

National team data 

 

1962 births
Living people
People from Menden (Sauerland)
Sportspeople from Arnsberg (region)
German footballers
Association football defenders
Bundesliga players
Borussia Mönchengladbach players
SV Werder Bremen players
Hannover 96 players
Ekstraklasa players
Widzew Łódź players
Germany international footballers
Germany under-21 international footballers
UEFA Euro 1988 players
German expatriate footballers
Expatriate footballers in Poland
German expatriate sportspeople in Poland
German football managers
Footballers from North Rhine-Westphalia
West German footballers